Godino is a surname found in Spanish and Italian. Notable people with this name include:
Cayetano Santos Godino (1896-1944), Argentinian serial killer
Javier Godino (born 1978), Spanish actor
Joe Godino, drummer for The Menzingers
Michele Godino (born 1992), Italian snowboarder

References